Dakota Grass Fed Beef is an American gourmet organic beef producer, specializing in grass-fed beef, operating a beef packing plant in Howard, South Dakota. The company provides its products to major retailers, gourmet stores, natural foods stores, and directly to consumers in the United States.

Dakota Beef operates its USDA certified organic beef processing plant in Howard, South Dakota. The company provides organic grass fed: steaks, ground beef, and hot dogs to national retailers, distributors, and food service accounts across the United States.

References

External links
 Dakota Grass Fed Beef

Brand name meats
Companies based in South Dakota
Food manufacturers of the United States